Barry Alfred Siddall (born 12 September 1954) is an English former professional football goalkeeper. When he retired from the game he had 614 appearances to his name over a 21-year career in the Football League, playing for numerous clubs. He played for 13 different Football League clubs: Bolton Wanderers, Sunderland, Darlington, Port Vale, Blackpool, Stoke City, Tranmere Rovers, Manchester City, Stockport County, Hartlepool United, Carlisle United, Chester City and Preston North End. He won promotion out of the Second Division, Third Division, and Fourth Division, and also played in the First Division.

Career
Siddall was educated at The Whitby High School, Ellesmere Port; where he was spotted by a Bolton scout, together with Paul Jones and Neil Whatmore.

He began his career with Bolton Wanderers, turning professional in January 1972 after a two-year apprenticeship. In four years with the Burnden Park club he made 137 league appearances. Jimmy Armfield's "Trotters" won the Third Division title in the 1972–73 season, and finished mid-table in the Second Division in 1973–74 and 1974–75. Under the stewardship of Ian Greaves, they went on to finish fourth in 1975–76, one point behind promoted West Bromwich Albion.

In September 1976, he moved north-east to join Sunderland for a £80,000 fee, with the aim of replacing retiring club legend Jimmy Montgomery. He made 167 league appearances for Jimmy Adamson's "Black Cats". The Roker Park outfit were relegated out of the First Division in 1976–77, and came close to winning promotion in 1977–78 and 1978–79, before they regained their top-flight status with a second-place finish under the stewardship of Ken Knighton in 1979–80; they finished just one point behind champions Leicester City. He was loaned out to Darlington during the 1980–81 season, who were managed by his former Sunderland boss Billy Elliott; Siddall played eight Fourth Division games at Feethams. Now managed by Alan Durban, Sunderland avoided relegation by one place and two points in 1981–82.

In August 1982, Siddall signed for John McGrath's Fourth Division Port Vale, and went on to make 81 league appearances for the "Valiants" in a two spell. The first choice keeper in the 1982–83 promotion campaign, he was sidelined for three months after sustaining a knee injury in a 3–1 win over Bristol City at Ashton Gate on 27 December 1982; Neville Southall was signed on loan to take his place. Teammate and club legend Phil Sproson named Siddall as the club's best goalkeeper of the 1980s. However, he handed in his notice at Vale Park in October 1983 following a contract dispute, and was loaned to Sam Ellis's Blackpool. Despite only spending the one month at Bloomfield Road, during his seven league games for the "Seasiders", Blackpool were the victors in six of them, which assisted in their finishing sixth in the Fourth Division. He ended the 1983–84 season with 45 appearances for Port Vale, though could not prevent the club suffering relegation out of the Third Division. He was in goal for Vale against Blackpool in a 1–1 draw on 18 September 1984, but his return to Bloomfield Road was an unhappy one as he injured his ankle. He featured just 12 times in the 1984–85 season, as new boss John Rudge preferred Chris Pearce.

Siddall was loaned out to Vale's rivals Stoke City in January 1985, and the move was made permanent two months later. He played 15 First Division games at the end of the 1984–85 season, though could not prevent Bill Asprey's "Potters" from being relegated in last place. He featured in just five Second Division games at the Victoria Ground in the 1985–86 campaign, as new boss Mick Mills preferred Peter Fox. He was also loaned out to Frank Worthington's Tranmere Rovers and Billy McNeill's Manchester City during the season, keeping goal in 12 Fourth Division games at Prenton Park and playing six First Division games during his time at Maine Road.

In 1986, Siddall returned to Blackpool, this time on a permanent basis. Sam Ellis was still in charge of the Bloomfield Road club, now a division higher, and Siddall went on to make 37 appearances during the 1986–87 season, as the club finished ninth in the Third Division. He was also first-choice during 1987–88, making 38 appearances, but in 1988–89 he was dropped a couple of times in favour of his deputies, Gary Kelly and Vince O'Keefe. He still made 35 starts in the league, however, but was sold at the end of the season to Stockport County.

Siddall went on the books of six clubs in four years: Hartlepool United, West Bromwich Albion, Mossley (where he played four Northern Premier League Premier Division games), Carlisle United, Chester City, Preston North End and Lincoln City. Leaving the Football League in 1993, he later played for Northwich Victoria, Horwich R.M.I. and Burnley. He was signed by Birmingham City manager Barry Fry on the mid-season transfer-deadline day in March 1995. He played a total of 614 Football League and two Conference games throughout his career, before becoming a freelance goalkeeping coach.

Style of play
Former Port Vale teammate Robbie Earle praised Siddall's assurance, and stated that he was "a confident guy who didn't suffer fools gladly".

Post-retirement
Upon retiring, Siddall worked for the Post Office in Kirkham, Lancashire.

Career statistics
Source:

A.  The "Other" column constitutes appearances and goals in the Anglo-Scottish Cup and Football League Trophy.

Honours
Bolton Wanderers
Football League Third Division: 1972–73

Sunderland
Football League Second Division second-place promotion: 1979–80

Port Vale
Football League Fourth Division third-place promotion: 1982–83

References

1954 births
Living people
People from Ellesmere Port
English footballers
English expatriate footballers
Association football goalkeepers
Bolton Wanderers F.C. players
Sunderland A.F.C. players
Darlington F.C. players
Vancouver Whitecaps (1974–1984) players
Port Vale F.C. players
Blackpool F.C. players
Stoke City F.C. players
Tranmere Rovers F.C. players
Manchester City F.C. players
Stockport County F.C. players
Hartlepool United F.C. players
West Bromwich Albion F.C. players
Mossley A.F.C. players
Carlisle United F.C. players
Chester City F.C. players
Preston North End F.C. players
Lincoln City F.C. players
Northwich Victoria F.C. players
Leigh Genesis F.C. players
Burnley F.C. players
Birmingham City F.C. players
Expatriate soccer players in Canada
English Football League players
North American Soccer League (1968–1984) players
Northern Premier League players
National League (English football) players
English expatriate sportspeople in Canada
Association football goalkeeping coaches